Fell Beck is a stream located near the foot of Ingleborough, in the Yorkshire Dales National Park. It is notable for the fact that it runs into Gaping Gill, the second-largest natural cave shaft in the UK (after Titan). As it falls down the shaft for 110 metres it is the tallest unbroken waterfall in the UK. It later emerges as Clapham Beck in Beck Head Cave, adjacent to Ingleborough Cave. At times it is blocked off by a temporary dam to allow members of the public to descend the shaft on a winch.

Beyond the village of Clapham, Clapham Beck flows into the River Wenning, which in turn flows into the River Lune and thence to the Irish Sea.

References

Yorkshire Dales
Lune catchment
Rivers of North Yorkshire